Adam Bakri (born May 15, 1988) is an Israeli-born Palestinian actor. He made his feature film debut by starring in Oscar-nominated film Omar, directed by Hany Abu-Assad. He currently lives in New York.

Early life
Adam Bakri comes from a cinematic family; he is the son of Mohammad Bakri, brother of Saleh Bakri and Ziad Bakri. After completing a bachelor's degree in English literature and Theater arts at Tel Aviv University, he trained at New York's Lee Strasberg Theatre and Film Institute.

Career
Bakri began his acting career in theater at the age of 13, when he first took the stage performing in Ululation of the Land at the Al-Midan Theater in Haifa and Nazareth. Shortly after his graduation, he landed the lead role in Hany Abu-Assad's drama thriller Omar.

In 2014, he was cast as the male lead in Asif Kapadia's adaptation of Ali and Nino, the Azerbaijan's national novel placed during the first Azerbaijan Democratic Republic.

In 2018, Bakri played the male lead in an Australian feature film titled Slam, written and directed by Partho Sen-Gupta, shot in Sydney, Australia. In England, he joined the main cast of Gavin Hood's political thriller Official Secrets in the role of Katharine Gun's husband.

Filmography

Awards and nominations

References

External links 

Living people
Palestinian male film actors
Israeli male film actors
Lee Strasberg Theatre and Film Institute alumni
Palestinian male actors
Israeli male stage actors
1988 births
Tel Aviv University alumni
Malmö Arab Film Festival winners